Allahverdi Teymur oglu Baghirov (April 22, 1946 – June 14, 1992) was an Azerbaijani officer, former leader of Azerbaijani Popular Front Party, head coach of Qarabağ FK and National Hero of Azerbaijan.

Early years
Seven daughters were born before his birth in his family, and his parents gave a name to him "Allahverdi" (means "God gave"). Allahverdi Baghirov was born in Aghdam and finished Aghdam school city number one in 1965. After graduating from school, he started working at Qarabagh FK as a head coach.

Football career 
Since childhood Allahverdi was fond of football, athletics and volleyball. He had an important role in victory of Aghdam  in various sports interregional competitions during school years and later. He played for Aghdam "Karabakh" (then the team was called "Mehsul"), where he played as a striker under number "5". Allahverdi Baghirov's brother Eldar Baghirov (1951-1991) also played for Qarabagh FK and was a defender. In 1970, Allahverdi Baghirov was captain of Aghdam - Jabrayil match for the "Golden Spike" Cup in Fuzuli.

From 1966 to 1983 Baghirov was the coach of the Agdam Children and Youth Sports School and worked for the "Qarabagh" football club. In 1976, he was appointed the head coach of the club and Azerbaijan took the fourth place with his help in the same year, on the World Unity Championship. In 1991 he took part in match between professional footballers of Qarabagh FK and "Neftchi". The match ended with a score of 1:1, The goal scored in the game belonged to Allahverdi.

Former soccer player Mushfig Huseynov recalled Allahverdi Bagirov:My first coach was the late National Hero Allahverdi Bagirov. Allahverdi muallim [teacher] taught us more about being honest than about football. He did a great job of preparing us for independent life. He really was a good example for the players.According to Zahid Garayev, a former Karabakh player and later Bagirov's comrade-in-arms, Allahverdi was both a very strict and very caring coach. Before every match Bagirov told the players: "Let's play in the morning and win!". He took care of his players, made sure they got everything they needed (food, water, etc.) on time. During away games, Bagirov would check each player's room before going to bed, making sure they were in place and everything was in order. But if any player was late for practice in the morning, Bagirov, according to Garaev, would punish the player and not allow him

Military service
In 1988, he voluntarily enlisted in the Azerbaijani Army in the war against Armenia over Nagorno-Karabakh region. In 1990, Baghirov created his own battalion and rescued many Azerbaijani citizens from Khojaly, while exchanging dead bodies of Azerbaijani soldiers with Armenian soldiers.

Participation in Karabakh War 
Baghirov had helped with financial assistance provided by the people of Agdam and by his private money to the small self-defense groups created in the villages of Garabagh. He fought in all battles of the Aghdam region. During the war, he was elected chairman of the Popular Front of Agdam. The flag of Independent Azerbaijan for the first time was raised by Allahverdi Baghirov in Aghdam.

In 1988, when the guard post was created between Askeran and Aghdam without awarding of the government, his brother-Eldar Baghirov was first volunteer who went there when outposts were created in all villages bordering with Armenians.

In August 1991, Allahverdi was shot in the leg by his childhood associate and childhood friend Jafar Imamaliyev as a result of the conflict, when Bagirov sided with Rahim Gaziyev, the future minister of defense republic.

On October 1, 1991, under the command of Allahverdi Bagirov and his brother Eldar Bagirov, military units of the National Army of Azerbaijan were formed in Agdam. Eldar Bagirov was appointed commander of the Agdam Territorial Self-Defense Battalion No. 845. The battalion of 760 men was called "Sons of the Fatherland." Eldar Bagirov, a member of the Supreme Council of Azerbaijan who signed the ''Act on the State Independence of the Republic of Azerbaijan'' in the same year, was mysteriously killed in front of his sister's house in the 4th district of Baku when he was returning from a meeting of the Supreme Council. After Eldar Bagirov's death, the battalion was given his name, and the battalion commander became Allahverdi Baghırov. Also after the death of Eldar, Allahverdi Bagirov stopped shaving beard. During the war Bagirov had the nickname Goja Gartal ( azerb. Qoca Qartal—Old Eagle).

In January 1992, all the forces and techniques of the Armenians in Naxchivanli village was  destroyed by Azerbaijani military units under the command of Allahverdi Baghirov, then progressed to the Askeran fortress with 150 warriors, created the opposite position with the village of Ketuk. It took just two hours for Allahverdi Baghirov's soldiers to complete the operation and replace Armenian flags with Azerbaijani flags. Allahverdi Baghirov was awarded the title of "General Mohammed Asadov" for this operation.

Participation in saving Khojaly captives 
During the Khojaly massacre, the battalion of Allahverdi Bagirov near Askeran managed to save hundreds of residents of the city. Bagirov made a great contribution to the removal of the bodies of those killed during the Khojaly massacre from the battlefield and the release of Azerbaijani prisoners in exchange for the bodies and captives of Armenian soldiers. Allahverdi Bagirov, through Vitaly Balasanyan, commander of the Armenian battalion in Askeran, saved more than 1003 residents of Khojaly from captivity in three days. According to Balasanyan, he handed over 1250 people to the Azerbaijanis. Bagirov received Azerbaijani prisoners at Garagadjy cemetery in Agdam district, brought them by bus and handed them over to their family.
It was as a result of Allahverdi Bagirov's talks with Vitaly Balasanyan that military operators Seyidagha Movsumov and Chingiz Mustafayev had the opportunity to film from the site of the Khojaly massacre. Thus, according to the then TV cameraman of the Azerbaijani Defense Ministry, Seyidagha Movsumov, he and the commander of the Agdam battalion, Allahverdi Bagirov, went to the checkpoint on the Askeran road. After negotiations with his opponent, Bagirov met with Balasanyan. It was Allahverdi Bagirov's first meeting with Vitaly Balasanyan on February 28 of 1992, two days after the Khojaly massacre. Bagirov told Balasanyan that his fighters wanted to collect the bodies and carry out video footage. At first Balasanyan did not agree to the shooting, but then Bagirov managed to persuade the Armenian commander; provided that the two Armenian soldiers will follow the Azerbaijanis to the end and no filming will be carried out without their permission. Bagirov agreed, after which Movsumov and several people of Bagirov got into the cars of the Armenian military and together with two trucks drove towards Khojaly. On that day, the fighters of Baghırov battalion were also able to carry the body of the commandant of Khojali airport, Alif Hajiyev. Also that day, at 10 p.m., the first group of Khojali Azerbaijanis, mostly women and children, was sent to Agdam.

Later Balasanyan recalled Bagirov:Our acquaintance and communication, definitely, have benefited me and him. In those days we solved hundreds of issues. With the help of Allahverdi, we were able to bring back the people who, for one reason or another, found themselves in enemy territory. I managed to get a lot of people out of their prisons. Allahverdi was a very responsible man: there was no case that I called him on any issue, and this issue would not have been resolved. It happened that our wounded guys were on their side, and the radio player reported it to me. I contacted Allahverdi, and we immediately returned the wounded. He didn't allow it to come down to the murder of our people.Military correspondent Emin Eminbeyli said that one day during the exchange of prisoners Bagirov suddenly hugged one of the Armenian captives and said directly to the camera that for many years he played football with him for the same team. The Armenian soldier replied to Bagirov that he was very hopeful that he would no longer be with him on opposite sides.

Death
On May 3, 1992, Bagirov was able to obtain information that Armenian forces were going to capture Shusha on the 8th. After passing this information to the state authorities, Allahverdi Bagirov summoned five soldiers to the headquarters and together with them began to develop a plan of action.

On June 12, 1992, Bagirov's battalion took part in the capture of the villages of Aranzamin, Nakhichevanik, Dagraz, Mirikend, Pirjamal. He believed that he would be able to reach Khankendi with his battalion. However, on his return from Nakhichevanik after checking the post, the UAS vehicle in which Allahverdi was staying was blown up by an anti-tank mine at the entrance of the village of Aranzamin; three survived, but him and the driver died. Upon learning of Bagirov's death, the commander of the Askeran battalion, Vitaly Balasanyan, contacted the Azerbaijani military on the radio and asked if Allahverdi had really died. When he heard that this was true, Balasanyan was very upset and scolded the Azerbaijanis: "How did you not save such a person?" 

By decree No. 476 of February 24, 1993  of the President of the Republic of Azerbaijan, Abulfaz Elchibey, Allahverdi Teymur ogly Baghirov, the commander of the military unit named Eldar Bagirov was posthumously awarded the title of National Hero of Azerbaijan for his personal courage and courage, shown during the protection of the territorial integrity of the Republic of Azerbaijan and the security of the civilian population. The National Hero's Gold Star Medal was presented to Bagirov's wife by Azerbaijani President Heydar Aliyev.

Funeral and Grave 
Baghirov was buried in his native Aghdam city, in the city's cemetery. At that time, most of those killed in Karabakh were buried in the Alley of Martyrs in Baku. Immediately after Baghirov's death, a grave was even prepared for him in Alley of Martyrs in Baku, but for certain reasons his family decided to bury Allahverdi next to his brother, Eldar Baghirov, in Aghdam cemetery. And in that same grave in Baku was buried journalist Chingiz Mustafayev, who died a few days after Bagirov. After the capture of the city by Armenian forces, the cemetery was destroyed.

On November 20, Azerbaijani armed forces, in accordance with a statement signed by the heads of Azerbaijan, Armenia and Russia on a cease-fire in Nagorno-Karabakh, which ended the renewed hostilities of autumn 2020, entered the territory of the Agdam district, and the President of Azerbaijan Ilham Aliyev announced on live television about the full transition of the area and city of Agdam under the control of the Azerbaijani army. On November 27 the daughters of Allahverdi Bagirov, officers Zumrud Bagirova and Aynur Bagirova, visited their father's grave after 27 years. The grave of the National Hero was beautified

National hero 
Baghirov Allahverdi Teymur oglu was awarded the title of "National Hero of Azerbaijan" after his death by the decree of the Azerbaijani President dated February 24, 1993. Later, by the decree of Heydar Aliyev, Allahverdi Baghirov was awarded with “the Golden Star” medal.

Personal life

 First wife - Russian (born in Aghdam; divorced)   
 Son - Elshan Bagirov (born 1972, Agdam) 
 Second wife - Valida Bagirova;
 Daughter - Zumrud Bagirova, Colonel-Lieutenant of the State Border Guard Service of Azerbaijan;
 Grandson - Ali Alizadeh.
 Daughter - Aynur Bagirova, captain of medical service of the State Border Service of Azerbaijan.
 Grandson - Burkhan Pashazadeh.

See also
Qarabağ FK
First Nagorno-Karabakh War

References

1946 births
1992 deaths
People from Agdam
Azerbaijani military personnel
Azerbaijani military personnel of the Nagorno-Karabakh War
Azerbaijani military personnel killed in action
National Heroes of Azerbaijan
Azerbaijani football managers
Qarabağ FK managers
Sportspeople from Agdam
Footballers from Agdam